James Brydges, 3rd Duke of Chandos PC (27 December 1731 – 29 September 1789), styled Viscount Wilton from birth until 1744 and Marquess of Carnarvon from 1744 to 1771, was a British peer and politician.

Background
Chandos was the only son of Henry Brydges, 2nd Duke of Chandos, and Lady Mary Bruce, daughter of Charles Bruce, 3rd Earl of Ailesbury. He was educated at Westminster School from 1742 to 1749, and then at Göttingen University in 1750/1751.

Political career
Chandos was Member of Parliament for Winchester from 1754 to 1761 and for Radnorshire between 1761 and 1768. He succeeded in the dukedom upon the death of his father on 28 November 1771.

He was a Gentleman of the Bedchamber to George, Prince of Wales from 1760 to 1764, the Lord Lieutenant of Hampshire in 1763–64 and 1771–80, sworn to the Privy Council on 12 May 1775 and appointed Lord Steward of the Household from December 1783 to his death in 1789.

Private life

Chandos's first marriage was to Margaret Nicol (1736–1768), daughter of John Nicol of Colney Hatch and Minchenden House, and his wife Winifred Keck, on 22 March 1753. They set up a London home at 39 Upper Grosvenor Street, Mayfair. Margaret inherited much of the great fortune acquired by her grandfather Sir Anthony Keck, and was the owner of a famous portrait of Shakespeare, which came to be known as the Chandos portrait following the marriage.

A decade after the death of his first wife, and having become Duke of Chandos in 1771, he married Anne Eliza Gamon, daughter of Richard Gamon of Datchworth Bury, Datchworth, on 21 June 1777. This second marriage produced the only child to survive to adulthood, Lady Anne Elizabeth Brydges (Lady Kinloss, died 1836) who married Richard Temple-Grenville, 1st Duke of Buckingham and Chandos. They were the parents of Richard Temple-Nugent-Brydges-Chandos-Grenville, 2nd Duke of Buckingham and Chandos.

Chandos died in September 1789, aged 57, when the Dukedom became extinct. He was buried in St Lawrence Whitchurch in Canons Park, London. His widow was declared a lunatic and confined to their London home, Chandos House; she was also made a ward of court. After her death in 1813, the unexpired lease was sold. A lengthy lawsuit in the Irish Courts over the management of her property ended dramatically in 1794 with the suicide of the presiding judge, Richard Power, who was accused of wrongfully withholding the funds the subject matter of the lawsuit, which had been lodged in Court.

References

1731 births
1789 deaths
People educated at Westminster School, London
James
3
James
Lord-Lieutenants of Hampshire
Carnarvon, James Brydges, Marquess of
Carnarvon, James Brydges, Marquess of
British MPs 1754–1761
British MPs 1761–1768
Members of the Privy Council of Great Britain
Grand Masters of the Premier Grand Lodge of England
Burials at the Chandos Mausoleum
Freemasons of the Premier Grand Lodge of England
British slave owners